York Harbour is a town in the Canadian province of Newfoundland and Labrador. The Post Office was established in 1960. The first Postmistress was Mrs. Stella Wheeler. The population was 372 in 2021.

Demographics 

See also
 List of communities in Newfoundland and Labrador

References

Towns in Newfoundland and Labrador